The 2014 Open GDF Suez de Cagnes-sur-Mer Alpes-Maritimes was a professional tennis tournament played on outdoor clay courts. It was the seventeenth edition of the tournament and part of the 2014 ITF Women's Circuit, offering a total of $100,000 in prize money. It took place in Cagnes-sur-Mer, France, on 5–11 May 2014.

Singles main draw entrants

Seeds 

 1 Rankings as of 28 April 2014

Other entrants 
The following players received wildcards into the singles main draw:
  Fiona Ferro
  Myrtille Georges
  Pauline Parmentier
  Tamira Paszek

The following players received entry from the qualifying draw:
  Ashleigh Barty
  Richèl Hogenkamp
  Daniela Seguel
  Sachia Vickery

The following players received entry by a lucky loser spot:
  Giulia Gatto-Monticone
  Irina Ramialison

Withdrawals 
Before the tournament
  Nadiya Kichenok

Champions

Singles 

  Sharon Fichman def.  Timea Bacsinszky 6–2, 6–2

Doubles 

  Kiki Bertens /  Johanna Larsson def.  Tatiana Búa /  Daniela Seguel 7–6(7–4), 6–4

External links 

 2014 Open GDF Suez de Cagnes-sur-Mer Alpes-Maritimes at ITFtennis.com
  

2014 ITF Women's Circuit
2014
2014 in French tennis
May 2014 sports events in France